Slave Act may refer to:
The Fugitive Slave Act of 1793, a law passed by the United States Congress.
The Slave Trade Act of 1794, a law passed by the United States Congress.
The Slave Trade Act 1807, an Act of Parliament in the United Kingdom.
The Act Prohibiting Importation of Slaves, a United States federal law from 1807.
The Slave Compensation Act 1837, an Act of Parliament in the United Kingdom.
The Fugitive Slave Law of 1850, a law passed by the United States Congress.